Peroxisome proliferator-activated receptor gamma coactivator-related protein 1 is a protein that in humans is encoded by the PPRC1 gene.

The protein encoded by this gene is similar to PPAR-gamma coactivator 1 (PPARGC1/PGC-1), a protein that can activate mitochondrial biogenesis in part through a direct interaction with nuclear respiratory factor 1 (NRF1). This protein has been shown to interact with NRF1. It is thought to be a functional relative of PPARGC1 that activates mitochondrial biogenesis through NRF1 in response to proliferative signals.

Interactions
PPRC1 has been shown to interact with USF2.

References

Further reading